Super Liga was the top division of the Federaçao Futebol Timor-Leste. It was replaced by Liga Futebol Amadora in 2015.

List of Champions
2005–06: Fima Sporting
2007–10 : not played

References

 
1
East Timor
Sports leagues established in 2004
2004 establishments in East Timor